Jordan has about 115 species of reptiles, most of them are snakes and lizards, but there are some turtles. No crocodiles are found in the country.

Statistics 
 Snakes: 45 species
 Lizards: 63 species
 Turtles: 7 species

Snakes

Lizards

Turtles

References 

Jordan
Reptiles of the Middle East
Jordan
Reptiles
 List